Beale Peak is a peak  southeast of Vantage Hill in the Ravens Mountains, Britannia Range. It was named by volcanologist David Richardson after Master Sergeant Garry A. Beale who served as the 109th Airlift Wing Logistics Planner during the transition of LC-130 operations from the U.S. Navy to the Air National Guard.

References 

Mountains of Oates Land